Clatterford End is a hamlet partly in the High Easter civil parish of the Uttlesford district, and partly in the Good Easter parish of the Chelmsford district, of Essex, England.

Hamlets in Essex
Uttlesford
City of Chelmsford